See also The Gay Hussar restaurant, and Tatárjárás (disambiguation)

The Gay Hussars is an operetta in three acts by Emmerich Kálmán.  The piece was Kalman's first operetta and a hit throughout Europe and America. The first version, in Hungarian, Tatárjárás, with libretto by Karl von Bakonyi and Andor Gábor, premiered at the Vígszinház in Budapest on 22 February 1908. The German version, Ein Herbstmanöver, with libretto by K. von Bakonyi and Robert Bodanzky, premiered in Vienna on 22 January 1909.  It was so popular that it prompted Kalman to move to Vienna.

English adaptations 
Its New York premiere, as The Gay Hussars, adapted by Maurice Brown Kirby with lyrics by Grant Stewart, was at the Knickerbocker Theatre on 29 July 1909 with W. H. Denny.  Another English adaptation played in London as Autumn Manoeuvres, opening in 1912 at the Adelphi Theatre with Robert Evett.  The piece then toured in Britain.

Roles

Selected recordings 
A version of Autumn Manoeuvers was recorded in 2003 by Ohio Light Opera.

References 
 , accessed 7 May 2019
Ganzl, Kurt, The Encyclopedia of the Musical Theatre, 2nd Ed., New York, Schirmer Books (2001), p. 1050.
A survey of Kalman operettas

External links 

 
 Biography of Kalman with information about The Gay Hussars

Operas by Emmerich Kálmán
Hungarian-language operettas
German-language operettas
1909 operas
Operas set in Hungary